Barbara Allen may refer to:

 Barbara Allen (politician) (fl. since 1985), Kansas state senator
 Barbara Allen (writer), pseudonym of Vivian Stuart (1914–1986)
 Barbara Allen Rainey (1948–1982), first woman designated a U.S. naval aviator
 Barbara Jo Allen (1906–1974), American actress
 "Barbara Allen" (song), broadside ballad

Allen, Barbara